Nottingham bus station may refer to:
Broadmarsh bus station
Nottingham Victoria bus station